Neolissochilus spinulosus is a species of cyprinid in the genus Neolissochilus. It is considered harmless to humans.

References

Cyprinidae
Cyprinid fish of Asia
Fish described in 1845